Kozhevnikovsky (masculine), Kozhevnikovskaya (feminine), or Kozhevnikovskoye (neuter) may refer to:
Kozhevnikovsky District, a district of Tomsk Oblast, Russia
Kozhevnikovskaya, a rural locality (a village) in Vologda Oblast, Russia